Livid is a 2011 French supernatural horror film written and directed by Julien Maury and Alexandre Bustillo. It is their follow-up to the horror film Inside.

Plot
Lucy Klavel is a young woman who starts her practical training as an at-home nurse. She is trained by an older lady, Mrs. Catherine Wilson. The last patient on their rounds lives in an old, remote mansion. Lucy enters the mansion, which is filled with stuffed animals, and finds Mrs. Wilson at the bed of the patient, Mrs. Deborah Jessel. Mrs. Wilson tells her that Jessel was once a prominent ballet teacher, but is now bedridden and in a coma. There is a rumor that Mrs. Jessel has a treasure of gold and jewels located somewhere on the property. After her first day on the job, Lucy tells her boyfriend, William, about the treasure. Lucy, Will, and Will's brother Ben decide to hunt for the treasure on Halloween night.

They enter the basement of the house through a window. In a room filled with stuffed animals gathered around a tea table, they find a single locked door. Lucy correctly suspects that a key worn by Jessel is the key to this door. Inside, they find a white sheet covering what looks like a stuffed mannequin of a young girl. Lucy suggests that this is the corpse of Jessel's mute daughter Anna, still dressed in a ballerina outfit. Lucy twists the key on the pedestal the corpse is standing on, and the corpse starts spinning slowly with music playing, like a ballerina on a music box.

They hear noises from the floor above and try to flee the house, but the window through which they entered is now secured by iron bars. While trying to find an exit, they become separated. Ben finds himself in an operating room with no door and no idea how he got there. He is killed by veiled ballerinas who appear out of nowhere.

Lucy sees Mrs. Jessel sitting at what was once Anna's tea party table. There is a flashback demonstrating that Mrs. Jessel was a very strict ballet teacher: a girl leaves the ballet class and Jessel later finds her lying dead in Anna's room; Anna is bent over the girl, drinking her blood. It is revealed that the Jessels are vampires.

Will is attacked by Ben, who is now a vampire. Will stabs Ben with a pair of scissors, but Mrs. Jessel attacks and kills him. Lucy discovers that Anna is not dead. Anna attempts to drink Lucy's blood, but Lucy pushes her away. Mrs. Wilson appears, attacks and sedates Lucy.

While Wilson watches, Mrs. Jessel implants the pupae of a moth into the throats of Lucy and Anna; this is a ritual to exchange their souls. Jessel believes that she has been successful when Anna awakes and her eye color has changed and she is in a different body. Jessel orders Anna to dance, but Anna does not respond. Wilson attempts to punish her, but Anna stabs her with scissors and then turns on Jessel. Both women fall to the floor. Although bleeding heavily, Jessel tries to bite Anna. Lucy whips her mother until she releases Anna, and the two girls throw Jessel off a third floor balcony.

Anna and Lucy escape from the mansion, and walk along a seaside cliff holding hands. Lucy (in Anna’s body) leans over the cliff, but she does not fall. Instead, she flies into the sky. Her scars disappear, and Anna (in Lucy’s body) watches her float away.

Production
The film went into production in 2009. It was initially intended to be Bustillo and Maury's English-language debut and shot in the United Kingdom but they moved to a lower-budget French production after they found that they were losing creative control over their story. A promo was shown at the American Film Market. The film was described as being more of a fantasy film than their previous film; "If Inside was meant to play as horror taken from fact then Livid plays as horror taken from fairy tale, the Grimm kind with all the bloody bits left in."

Cast
Chloé Coulloud as Lucy 
Jérémy Kapone as Ben
Félix Moati as William
Catherine Jacob as Mrs. Wilson
Marie-Claude Pietragalla as Deborah Jessel
Chloé Marcq as Anna
Loïc Berthezene as Lucy's father
Béatrice Dalle as Lucy's mother
Rajan Maman as Tony's Son

Release
Livid was shown at the Toronto International Film Festival on September 11, 2011. On  October 12, the film was shown at the Sitges Film Festival. Marc Thiébault won the award for Best Production Design at the festival for his work in Livid. The film opened in France on December 7, 2011. A release in the United States was planned with Dimension Films acquiring the rights to the film ahead of its festival premiere. The film would lay dormant at the studio for over a decade until Shudder purchased the rights to film, debuting it for the first time in the United States on March 1, 2022.

Reception

Variety compared the film to the director's previous film Inside, stating that "the pic is so eager to go over the top that, in the end, it doesn't make much sense." Screen Daily gave a positive review of the film, comparing it to the works of Guillermo del Toro and Dario Argento. The Hollywood Reporter gave the film a negative review, stating that it was neither "gory nor eerie enough to function as veritable horror fare".

Horror magazine Fangoria gave the film a positive review of three out of four, stating that the film's "final moments are a bit stretched and its end is sillier than probably intended. It’s imperfect, yes, but entirely worth loving; likely and hopefully appreciated and adored over time."

Remake
An English-language remake for the film was written by David Birke  and was to be directed by Nicholas McCarthy, but was not made.

References

External links

2011 films
2011 horror films
French dark fantasy films
2010s French-language films
Supernatural fantasy films
French supernatural horror films
French vampire films
Films directed by Julien Maury and Alexandre Bustillo
Films set in country houses
Halloween horror films
2010s French films